Paul Gauselmann (born 26 August 1934) is a German businessman, the founder and CEO of Gauselmann, a German company that produces slot machines, and runs gambling arcades.

Early life
Paul Gauselmann was born on 26 August 1934 in Borghorst, North Rhine-Westphalia, Germany.

Honors 
In 1993 Paul Gauselmann received the Federal Cross of Merit (Bundesverdienstkreuz) (Knight's Cross), in 2003 he has been appointed to be awarded to the Officer's Cross. He is honorary citizen of Espelkamp and Lübbecke.

Career 
Gauselmann has had over 200 of his inventions patented. His company makes around 50,000 gaming machines a year.

For many years he has been chairman of the slot machine business association VDAI.

Sponsorship 
At his 65th birthday, Gauselmann initiated the Gauselmann Foundation, which supports social projects in his hometown Espelkamp.

He supports many organizations, including:
 TuS-N-Lübbecke (Handball-Bundesliga / National German Handball League)
 German Stroke Foundation (Deutsche Schlaganfall Stiftung)
 TV Espelkamp (Tennis Club - National German League)
 Kaiser-Wilhelm statue

Personal life
Gauselmann is married to Karin Gauselmann. Karin is a member of the supervisory board of Gauselmann AG.

They have four sons:
 Peter Gauselmann
 Michael Gauselmann (Co-CEO Gauselmann AG)
 Armin Gauselmann (member of the board Gauselmann AG)
 Karsten Gauselmann

He has four older brothers: : Heinz, Josef, Eugen and Willi.

References

External links 
 Gauselmann Gruppe

1934 births
Living people
People from Steinfurt
Businesspeople from North Rhine-Westphalia
People from the Province of Westphalia
Officers Crosses of the Order of Merit of the Federal Republic of Germany
People named in the Paradise Papers